Focal nodular hyperplasia (FNH) is a benign tumor of the liver (hepatic tumor), which is the second most prevalent tumor of the liver (the first is hepatic hemangioma). It is usually asymptomatic, rarely grows or bleeds, and has no malignant potential. This tumour was once often resected because it was difficult to distinguish from hepatic adenoma, but with modern multiphase imaging is usually now diagnosed by strict imaging criteria and not resected.

Presentation

Focal nodular hyperplasia's most recognizable gross feature is a central stellate scar seen in 60–70% of cases.  Microscopically, a lobular proliferation of bland-appearing hepatocytes with a bile ductular proliferation and malformed vessels within the fibrous scar is the most common pattern. Other patterns include telangiectatic, hyperplastic-adenomatous, and lesions with focal large-cell dysplasia. Rarely, these lesions may be multiple or can occur as part of a syndrome with hemangiomas, epithelioid hemangioendothelioma, hepatic adenomas, fibrolamellar hepatocellular carcinoma, vascular malformations of the brain, meningiomas, and/or astrocytomas.

Pathophysiology
FNH is not a true neoplasm; it is believed to result from localized hyperplastic hepatocyte response to an underlying congenital arteriovenous malformation. It consists of normal liver constituents in an abnormally organized pattern, grows in a stellate pattern and may display central necrosis when large. Additionally evidence suggests that the incidence of FNH is related to oral contraceptive use.

Diagnosis
Unenhanced CT or MRI usually does not show the difference in intensity between the FNH and surrounding liver except when there is marked liver steatosis that reduces the attenuation of the liver, causing FNH to be hyperattenuating when compared with the surrounding liver. In the arterial phase CT or MRI, there is a strong enhancement not followed by washout. The lesion presents a slight hyperintensity or isodensity on portal venous phase or delayed phase images. There is also a presence of a central scar and absence of a capsule for the FNH.

Epidemiology
The prevalence of FNH of individuals undergoing evaluation with an ultrasound of the abdomen is 0.03%. About 20% of FNH lesions are associated with hepatic hemangiomas.

Notes

References

External links 

Hepatology